The Faculty of Veterinary Science is a faculty of the University of Pretoria. Founded in 1920, it is the second oldest veterinary faculty in Africa. With the exception of the faculties in Khartoum (Sudan, 1938), and Cairo (Egypt, 1946), all the other African faculties were established after 1960. It is the only one of its kind in South Africa and is one of 33 veterinary faculties in Africa.

Since 1997, the university as a whole has produced more research outputs every year than any other institution of higher learning in South Africa, as measured by the Department of Education's accreditation benchmark.

The Faculty offers an undergraduate veterinary degree programme and a veterinary nursing diploma programme as well as a variety of postgraduate degree programmes.

Graduates of the Faculty enjoy national and international recognition and the BVSc degree of the University of Pretoria currently enjoys recognition for registration by the Royal College of Veterinary Surgeons (RCVS) in the UK, the Australasian Veterinary Boards Council (AVBC) in Australia, New Zealand and Tasmania as well as by the relevant authorities in Malaysia.

History 

The first Colonial Veterinary Surgeon in South Africa was appointed in approximately 1874 in Port Natal (present day Durban in KwaZulu-Natal), followed by the appointment of the first Colonial Veterinary Surgeon in the Cape Colony in 1876 and the subsequent arrival of private practitioners in the late 19th century. A major event was the arrival in 1891 of a Swiss-born veterinarian, Arnold Theiler, who went on to establish a disinfection station and vaccine factory at Daspoort close to Pretoria in 1898, to produce vaccines and conduct research. In March 1898, Theiler was appointed director of the Bacterial Institute at Daspoort. Despite the unhealthiness of the site, and the very inadequate facilities consisting of wood-and iron buildings and stables, an enormous amount of valuable research work was produced at Daspoort. When this facility became unsuitable in 1905, Theiler was instrumental in establishing a new facility at Onderstepoort in 1908, which became the current Agricultural Research Council's Onderstepoort Veterinary Institute. The sum of 40 000 pounds was voted for this purpose.

A new site was selected on the farm De Onderstepoort, 11 km north of Church Square, because of its central position near the seat of government in Pretoria, its proximity to main railway lines, and satisfactory climate for human health. It is also an area where diseases such as horse sickness and bluetongue which were being investigated, were prevalent. The new laboratory building which is still known as the "Main Building", the quadrangle of stables behind it, and other necessary facilities and staff houses were completed and ready for occupation by October 1908.

During this time and in the years thereafter, the possibility of training veterinarians in South Africa was frequently raised but it was not until 1920 that Sir Arnold Theiler was appointed as Director of Veterinary Education and Research. He served as the first Dean of veterinary science at "Onderstepoort" under the supervision of the then Transvaal University College. New facilities were inaugurated at the end of 1921 and the first residence was opened in 1924. The first eight South African trained veterinarians qualified in 1924.

When the Union of South Africa was formed from the provinces of the Transvaal, Natal, the Cape Province and the Orange Free State in 1910, Onderstepoort became the headquarters of veterinary research for the whole country.

The initial intakes were small and the number of veterinarians graduating from the Faculty every year remained below 20 until 1956. The first batch of graduates to exceed 40 in number, qualified in 1967. The numbers fluctuated around the 40 mark until 1978 and was followed by the first large batch of graduates in 1979 (69) following an increase in the intake of second year students in 1976. The intake was increased to 120 per annum in 2000 and to 135 in 2005.

The Faculty was the only one of its kind in South Africa until 1980 when a second Faculty of Veterinary Science was established within the Medical University of South Africa (MEDUNSA). This Faculty admitted its first students in 1982, produced its first graduates in 1987 and was amalgamated with the Faculty of Veterinary Science of the University of Pretoria in 1999. The new National Faculty created in this way continues to use the facilities of the Onderstepoort campus of the University of Pretoria and continues to function as a fully-fledged faculty of the University of Pretoria. It is once again the only one of its kind in South Africa.

Facilities
The Faculty of Veterinary Science is situated at Onderstepoort in the north of Pretoria which is a property of 65 hectares. Onderstepoort is a generic name for a hub of three institutions in the vicinity, namely the Faculty, Onderstepoort Biological Products (OBP) and the Onderstepoort Veterinary Institute (OVI). All three institutions are independent. The Onderstepoort campus of the University is 30 km north west of the main campus in Hatfield and 15 km north of the city center of Pretoria.

The buildings on the Onderstepoort campus cover a total of 55 000 m2 and consist of the following:
 The Arnold Theiler building
 The Onderstepoort Veterinary Academic Hospital (OVAH)
 Department of Veterinary Tropical Diseases and support services of the central Department of Education Innovation
 Department of Anatomy and Physiology (sections of Anatomy and Histology, including electron microscopy)
 Departments of Anatomy and Physiology (section of Physiology), Centre for Veterinary Wildlife Studies
 Department of Production Animal Studies
 Department of Paraclinical Sciences (sections of Veterinary Public Health and Pathology)
 Equine Research Centre
 Camps, paddocks and animal handling facilities (including a small dairy) managed by the Onderstepoort Animal Teaching Unit (OTAU)
 Residence annexes
 Student residence and associated sports fields
 Biomedical Research Centre (UPBRC)

Departments
The faculty has 5 academic departments responsible for teaching, research and service rendering. These activities are further facilitated by well developed support services provided by an academic hospital, various departmental laboratories, general and student administrative sections, a teaching animal unit and a number of research centres. The Onderstepoort Veterinary Academic Hospital provides clinical services rendered with full student participation as part of the primary teaching mission of the Faculty of Veterinary Science.

Anatomy and physiology

The Anatomy Section is responsible for teaching undergraduate- and postgraduate macroscopical and microscopical anatomy to veterinary science and nursing students. The undergraduate teaching programme includes the Electron Microscope Unit canine anatomy presented to the BSc (VetBiol) III students and comparative anatomy of equine, ruminants, porcine, birds and fish presented to the BVSc I students. MSc and PhD programmes in veterinary anatomy are presented in the department. Various postgraduate anatomy courses are also presented to students registered for the specialist MMedVet degree. The main focus of research in the department is on the anatomy of wild animals and the reproductive biology of birds and mammals.

The Veterinary Physiology Section is responsible for teaching and research in basic and applied physiology and physiological chemistry. A complete course in fundamental animal physiology and physiological chemistry is taught in the VAP 300 module presented to the BSc (VetBiol) III students, followed by a course in Applied Physiology in the BVSc I year. It is problem-based and focuses the student on the holistic approach to treating the whole animal. The Section also teaches a fundamental course in Physiology and Physiological Chemistry to the first-year DipVet student nurses. Research areas are focused upon metabolic adaptation of indigenous sheep and goats, water and electrolyte balance in sheep, and certain facets of nanotechnology.

Companion animal clinical studies

The Department of Companion Animal Clinical Studies is responsible for teaching, service rendering and research in the disciplines of Anaesthesiology, Clinical Pathology, Dentistry, Diagnostic Imaging, Ophthalmology, Equine Medicine & Surgery, and Small Animal Medicine & Surgery.

Paraclinical sciences

The Department of Paraclinical Sciences is one of five academic departments of the Faculty of Veterinary Science. The Department was formed in May 2001 following restructuring at the Faculty. The Department comprises four sections representing the primary disciplines of Pathology, Pharmacology, Toxicology and Veterinary Public Health. The Phytomedicine programme is also hosted in the Department. While each individual section is responsible for the maintenance and development of their respective disciplines, they function as a unit in pursuing the Departmental mission.

Production animal studies

The Department of Production Animal Studies is subdivided according to activities. These divisions are:
 The Animal Production and Ethology Section is responsible for the presentation of courses in basic animal production, welfare and animal handling
 The Epidemiology Section deals with all aspects of veterinary epidemiology
 The Herd Health Section visits various production animal farms and empowers students to practice preventive medicine
 The Production Animal Clinical Section takes care of the medical and surgical production animal cases in the Onderstepoort Veterinary Academic Hospital and surrounding communities
 The Reproduction section teaches students about reproductive disorders and biotechnology in all species. Specialists in the section supply a service to farmers and breeders
 The Poultry Reference Centre deals with all aspects of poultry health and production in close association with the poultry industry

Veterinary tropical diseases

In the domain of Tropical Animal Health, the Department of Veterinary Tropical Diseases (DVTD) is well positioned to play a leading role, especially in research and the training of postgraduate students of the region and further afield.

Research
There are four main research centres within the faculty:
 Centre for Veterinary Wildlife Studies
 Equine Research Centre
 Veterinary Pharmacovigilance Centre
 UP Biomedical Research Centre

Academic programmes
The Faculty of Veterinary Science of the University of Pretoria offers a BVSc degree which is recognised by the South African Veterinary Council for registration as Veterinarian which entitles the holder to practice as a veterinarian. It is also recognised as such by the Royal College of Veterinary Surgeons (RCVS) in the UK, the Australasian Veterinary Boards Council (AVBC) in Australia, New Zealand and Tasmania as well as by the relevant authorities in Malaysia.
It also offer a University Diploma in Veterinary Nursing (DipVetNurs; also referred to as DVN) which is recognised by the South African Veterinary Council for registration as Veterinary Nurse which entitles the holder to practise the profession of veterinary nursing.

The faculty also offers a number of postgraduate courses including BVSc Honours, MMedVet, MSc, PhD and DVSc courses.

The undergraduate veterinary programme has developed from the original 5-year programme to a five-and-a-half-year programme in the mid 1970s, 1980s and early 1990s. It was changed to a 6-year programme in the late 1990s and to a split degree structure consisting of a 3-year BSc (Veterinary Biology) degree and 4-year BVSc degree in 2003. Since 2011, students who are already enrolled in the programme will need 3 years to complete the BSc (Veterinary Biology) degree and another 4 years for the 4-year BVSc degree; a total of 7 years. Students who will be admitted to the new degree programme from 2011 onwards will need only 6 years to complete the programme. The first 2 – 3 cohorts of students in the new programme will also take 7 years to complete the programme due to transitional arrangements.

The academic activities of the Faculty of Veterinary Science usually commence early in January each year and end towards the second half of November. Academic semesters are of equal length (approximately 14 weeks) with recesses during Easter, July and December.

DipVetNurs

The diploma programme requires two years of full-time study at the Onderstepoort campus of the University of Pretoria. The first year is devoted to more basic courses in Anatomy, Physiology, Pharmacology, Ethology, Microbiology, Parasitology, Laboratory Technique and General Nursing. It also includes promotion courses in Medical Nursing, Reproductive Nursing and Theatre Practice. The second year is devoted to Medical Nursing, Reproductive Nursing, Theatre Practice, Anaesthesiology, Radiography and Surgical Nursing. It also includes a lecture-free semester of clinical training in the Academic Hospital and approved private veterinary facilities. An Academic Information Week is offered at the beginning of the academic year for all new students and includes a life skills course. Attendance is compulsory. The addition of a further year of study and converting the diploma programme into a degree programme is currently under consideration.

BVSc

Existing (old) degree

This programme, which followed on the completion of the BSc (Veterinary Biology) degree programme, will be presented for the last time from 2012 to 2015. It will be sequentially phased out as students progress through the various years of study.

New degree

A new core-elective degree programme has been developed to replace the previous programme. It was introduced in 2011 and is an internationally recognised and recommended approach and will continue to allow graduates to register and work as veterinarians in South Africa. With the exception of the first year of study, which is offered on the Hatfield campus, it will be offered on a full-time basis on the Onderstepoort campus of the University of Pretoria.

The first semester of the first year of study will consist of the same modules as those originally found in the BSc (Veterinary Biology) programme and currently in the BSc (Agric)(Animal Science / Biological Science) programmes. One exception is the addition of Medical Terminology. This trend will be continued in the second semester although some modules will be excluded in favour of new modules in Animal Nutrition, Introductory Animal Production and Professional Life. The latter will run throughout the programme and concentrate on the soft skills and ethical and professional aspects of the veterinary profession.

From the second year of study, the programme will be presented on the Onderstepoort campus of the University. It will deal exclusively with basic veterinary disciplines such as Anatomy, Histology, Microbiology and Physiology as well as modules in Animal Science, Pasture Science and Professional Life.

The third year will be devoted to the causes and effects of disease and will include modules on Infectious Diseases, Parasitology, Toxicology, Pharmacology, Organ Pathology and Professional Life.

In the fourth year, the student will be introduced to modules aimed at diagnostics and therapeutics and in the first semester of the fifth year with community interaction. Specific species-directed modules in these semesters will also be presented. In the second semester of the fifth year the emphasis will be on the didactic components of the elective modules chosen by students.

The remaining approximately 12 months will be devoted to experiential training in the core and elective components in the academic hospital as well as in satellite and other approved facilities.

BVSc(Hons)

The honours degree provides the student with a broad scientific background in the theoretical aspects of the modules offered. A selection of related modules is required to the value of 120 SAQA credits (24 to 30 faculty credits in the current credit-rating system). The knowledge gained in this degree programme can be applied in general practice and Faculty credits earned may be recognised for a period of two years in a subsequent MMedVet degree programme. Conferment of the honours degree is not subject to future registration in the master's degree programme.

The modules are classified on a general, discipline-based and species-based basis and there are no restrictions in terms of credits in these categories. Modules offered in other Faculties of the University may also be included if approved.

MMedVet

The master's degree in Veterinary Medicine is a professional specialist degree which equips the student with a broad scientific background in the theoretical aspects of the discipline and provides specific skills and competencies in the chosen specialty. Holders of the degree are registerable with the South African Veterinary Council as specialists provided they are also registerable as veterinarians. The programme covers theoretical and practical training in the chosen specialty and requires the completion of a research project and submission of a dissertation. A module in research methodology is compulsory. Some of the programmes are recognised as suitable programmes for preparation for overseas diplomate college examinations.

Selection procedures
The Faculty of Veterinary Science of the University of Pretoria is unique in the sense that it is the only faculty that trains veterinarians and veterinary nurses in South Africa. This places a special responsibility on the Faculty and University to meet the national needs in the provision of veterinarians and veterinary nurses to serve all sectors of veterinary endeavors. South Africa's food security and animal disease control will be severely at risk if there is no sufficient supply of veterinarians and veterinary nurses for state veterinary services or for rural areas and farming communities.

The Faculty will admit students to the first year of Veterinary Science (BVSc I) as well as to the second year (BVSc II) according to its selection regulations approved by Senate. For admission to the first year, applicants are evaluated for admission in separate categories as follows:
 School leavers
 Students with previous university exposure
 International students
 Specific sector requirements – nominated students
For admission to the second year, applicants are evaluated for admission in the following categories depending on module combinations:
 Students with previous university exposure
 International students
Admission to DipVetNurs is in the first year only. Categories are as follows:
 School leavers
 Students with previous university exposure
 International students
 Specific sector requirements
 Repeating students

Accommodation
The faculty's first residence opened in 1924, the same year as its first year students, all eight of them, graduated. Intake remained small, below the 20 mark, until 1956, with the first batch to exceed 40 qualifying in 1967. Number fluctuated around the 40 mark until 1978 with 69 graduates in 1979. It remained around the 85 students a year mark until 2007. In 2008 a total of 99 students graduated and this grew to 119 in 2009.

The residence at the Faculty is known as House Onderstepoort. House Onderstepoort is unique among all the UP residences in that both undergraduate and postgraduate students are accommodated. The current number of students who can be accommodated at the Onderstepoort campus is 604. In May 2010 a R90m accommodation project was started to increase and improve the accommodation facilities at the campus. The improvements made Onderstepoort the second largest University sustained residence at the University of Pretoria. The new accommodation was made for 144 students, 48 postgraduate students and 24 doing post-doctoral work. The new facilities were officially opened on 22 February. The size of the residence is a major factor in the number of students that the faculty can accept, and being the only veterinary faculty in South Africa, they are trying to provide for the high demand of Veterinarians. The infrastructure around the residence, including roads and parking areas, as well as landscaping, was improved. Existing facilities and the security of the residence were also upgraded and refurbished.

Deans of the Faculty of Veterinary Science
 Arnold Theiler
 Petrus Johann du Toit

References

External links
 Onderstepoort Veterinary Academic Hospital
 University of Pretoria, Faculty of Veterinary Science
 South African Veterinary Association
 South African Veterinary Council

Pretoria
University of Pretoria
Educational institutions established in 1920
1920 establishments in South Africa